The 2019 IHF Super Globe was the thirteenth edition of the IHF Men's Super Globe, a yearly club world championship in handball organised by the International Handball Federation (IHF). The tournament was held in Dammam, Saudi Arabia from 27 to 31 August 2019.

FC Barcelona won their fifth title after defeating THW Kiel 34–32 in the final.

Venue
The championship was played in Dammam, at the Ministry of Sports Hall.

Teams

Ten teams were competing in the 2019 tournament, two more than in previous tournament. This is due to the split of the Pan-American Team Handball Federation at an IHF Council meeting in Zagreb which was split into the North America and the Caribbean Handball Confederation (NACHC) and the South and Central America Handball Confederation (SCAHC). New York City THC became the first team from North America to compete in the IHF Super Globe after finishing top of the continental championship. The winners of continental tournaments, the defending champion, a host team and wild card teams participated.

Results
All times are local (UTC+3).

Bracket

Quarterfinals qualification

Quarterfinals

Placement round 5–10

Group A

Group B

Semifinals

Third place game

Final

Final ranking

References

External links
IHF Super Globe

2019 in handball
2019
2019 in Saudi Arabian sport
International handball competitions hosted by Saudi Arabia
Handball in Saudi Arabia
August 2019 sports events in Asia